was  the former Head coach of the Chiba Jets in the Japanese Bj League.

Head coaching record

|- 
|-
| style="text-align:left;"|Chiba Jets
| style="text-align:left;"|2011-12
| 52||18||34|||| style="text-align:center;"|9th in Eastern|||-||-||-||
| style="text-align:center;"|-
|-

References

1968 births
2019 deaths
Chiba Jets Funabashi coaches
Wakayama Trians coaches